Jonathon Jason Kingsley  (born December 1964) is a British businessman. He is the co-founder and CEO of video game developer Rebellion Developments.

Background
Kingsley was born in Osgathorpe, Leicestershire. He attended Loughborough Grammar School and then Wyggeston and Queen Elizabeth I College. He read zoology at St John's College, Oxford.

Kingsley established the company Rebellion Developments in 1992 with his brother Chris. Kingsley is also the chairman of The Independent Game Developers' Association (TIGA). In 2012, he was made an Officer of the Order of the British Empire (OBE) for service to the economy.

In 2017, Kingsley launched a medieval history YouTube channel called Modern History TV, of which he is the creator, producer, writer, and presenter, along with his brother Chris Kingsley, and senior producer Brian Jenkins, under the banner of Rebellion Productions.

References

1964 births
Alumni of St John's College, Oxford
British chief executives
Living people
Officers of the Order of the British Empire
People from North West Leicestershire District
Video game businesspeople